Justin Staritski (born 10 July 1970) is a former Australian rules footballer who played with North Melbourne and Collingwood in the Australian Football League (AFL).

A midfielder, Staritski was recruited from Norwood in the South Australian National Football League. He was drafted before the 1989 VFL season but didn't play his first senior game until 1991. He averaged 16 disposals from his 16 games for North Melbourne that year. The following season he appeared nine times and then didn't play a league game in 1993. Collingwood selected him in the 1994 Pre-Season Draft, with pick 37, but he would only play once for his new club.

Staritski has been involved in amateur football after leaving the AFL. He played briefly with the University Blues and as of 2018 is the coach of South Australian Amateur Football League club the Glenunga Rams.

References

1970 births
Australian rules footballers from South Australia
North Melbourne Football Club players
Collingwood Football Club players
Norwood Football Club players
University Blues Football Club players
Living people